AGORA is the acronym for the Access to Global Online Research on Agriculture program. It was launched in 2003 by the Food and Agriculture Organization of the United Nations (FAO) in partnership with Cornell University and up to 70 of the world's leading science publishers, to provide free or low-price online access to leading peer-reviewed publications in agriculture and related biological, environmental and social sciences to more than 100 lower-income countries.

Coordinated by the FAO on behalf of its many public and private partners, the goal is to support the effective use of agricultural research, education and training by academics, students, practitioners and government personnel with access to high-quality, relevant and timely agricultural information on the internet.

Close to 3,000 institutions are registered with AGORA, giving access to almost 6,000 journals and 22,000 books including subscription-based and open access information resources across a variety of topical areas.

There are currently 28,000 total resources available online to institutions in over 100 countries, with over 15,000 new e-books added to the platform in 2016.

Research4Life

AGORA is part of Research4Life, the collective name for four programs – HINARI (focusing on health), AGORA (focusing on agriculture), OARE (focusing on environment), and ARDI (focusing on applied science and technology) that provide free or low-cost online access to peer-reviewed international scientific journals, books and databases in several languages.

Research4Life was set up to bridge the knowledge gap between high and low to middle income countries. The Research4Life programmes are a public-private partnership between World Health Organization (WHO), Food and Agriculture Organization of the United Nations (FAO), United Nations Environment Programme (UNEP), Cornell and Yale Universities and the International Association of Scientific, Technical, and Medical Publishers, in addition to over 200 publisher partners.

The AGORA program, its sister programs and their publishing partners originally committed to continuing the initiative until at least 2015.
Research4Life has an updated count of 69,000 resources available across its four programmes. 
Publishers are committed to working with Research4Life in its current format at least until the end of 2020. At that time, the initiative will be reviewed and adapted as needed.

History
The AGORA program was launched in October 2003 with FAO and nine founding publishers: Blackwell Publishing, CABI Publishing, Elsevier, Kluwer Academic Publishers, Lippincott, Williams & Wilkins, Nature Publishing Group, Oxford University Press, Springer-Verlag, and John Wiley & Sons. Other key partners include Cornell University. Currently up to 70 publishers participate in AGORA, providing peer-reviewed academic content.

When launched, AGORA provided access to 400 journals. As of March 2010, the initiative had increased to providing access to over 1,278 journals. As of 2016 AGORA contains 6,000 journals and 22,000 books, for a total of 28,000 resources.

The original development occurred in two phases: Phase I, in 2003, allowed access to 69 countries. Phase II increased this by allowing around 30 additional countries access at low cost.

Content and subjects
The scope of the research resources is wide-ranging. AGORA features 22 topical themes, on: agriculture, animal science, applied microbiology, aquatic science, biochemistry, biology, biophysics, biotechnology, chemistry, ecology, economics, entomology, environment, fisheries, food science, forestry, natural resources, nutrition, pest control, plant science, social science, soil science.

Publications are in several languages and are a mixture of journals, books, e-books, media reports and technical reports. Users can browse through the journals and make searches using AGORA's Summon and Scope search engines.

Access

Eligible institutions whose staff and students may access the journals are national universities, and colleges, (medicine, agriculture, pharmacy, public health, engineering, etc.), teaching hospitals and healthcare centers, local non-governmental organizations, research institutes, agricultural extension centres, government offices and libraries.  International organizations are not eligible.

Access to AGORA is either free or low-cost depending on whether an institution falls into a Group A (free) or Group B (low-cost) category, based on key factors to do with a country's wealth.  AGORA costs US$1500 per institution per calendar year from January through December for institutions in Group B countries. When a cost applies Research4Life invests the income generated back into local training initiatives to help increase awareness and usage of all four Research4Life programmes amongst librarians and scientists. The cost covers access to all four Research4Life programmes, but separate registrations are required.

All eligible institutions registering and accepted from Group B will receive a six-month trial without payment. If an institution is in a Group B (low-cost access) country, area or territory and cannot or chooses not to pay the annual fee the institution will still be eligible for free access to a small number of information resources.

Those not eligible for full access to AGORA and Research4Life can still freely access abstracts of all the journals and also the free full-text journals linked from AGORA. A username is not needed to access these resources. Look for the "free collections" Menu and the Accessible Content tabs of the portal.

Registration

Institutions can register for AGORA through its parent programme Research4Life. Read the registration instructions linked from AGORA. Only one registration is required per institution.

The programmes do not accept registrations from individuals. During the registration process if a country is not listed, it means it is not eligible for Research4Life programmes. If approved, the institution's librarian will be contacted and given detailed instructions on how to access and use the system.

Once an institution is registered with AGORA one password is assigned for the entire institution.  All members (researchers, teaching and administrative staff, students) of a registered institution, and its on-site visitors, are then eligible to access AGORA

AGORA Partners

Each partner is responsible for a different aspect of AGORA. The partners meet at regular intervals to determine how the programme works and develops. Feedback from the participating institutions contributes significantly to the development of the programme.

Restrictions

Due to publishers' market interests and business plans, not all developing countries are eligible, as in some of these countries, the publishers have significant levels of existing subscriptions. Some of these countries include South Africa, India and China.

Critics find problems with the use of GNI as a criterion, however. China, for example, is a large developing country facing an information divide, which is not reflected by the GNI. In large cities and coastal areas of China, per capita GNI can be four times that of the poor localities, yet poor 'local' researchers cannot get low-price access because China as a whole surpasses the baseline criterion.

Related initiatives
 HINARI (Access to Research Initiative) launched in 2002 and is administered by World Health Organization (WHO).
 OARE (Online Access to Research in the Environment) launched in October 2006 and is coordinated by the United Nations Environment Programme (UNEP).
 ARDI (Access to Research for Development and Innovation) launched in 2010 and administered by the World Intellectual Property Organization (WIPO)
 TEEAL (The Essential Electronic Agricultural Library) Project is administered through Mann Library's Collection and Services Department.
 ITOCA (Information Training and Outreach Centre for Africa), in Pretoria, South Africa, handles awareness and training missions across the African continent.

References

External links
 Research4Life Partnership
 AGORA
 ARDI
 HINARI
 OARE
 Summon and Scope 
 United Nations 
 Cornell University 
 Yale University
 International Association of Scientific, Technical, and Medical Publishers
 UNEP

Food and Agriculture Organization
Agricultural research